Ikatan Masyarakat Islam Malaysia (Malay for "Muslim Community Union of Malaysia", abbreviated IKATAN)  was a minor Islamic political party formed in 1991 and based in Terengganu.

IKATAN was a splinter party of Muslim People's Party of Malaysia (HAMIM), founded by Abdul Wahab Yunus, former Member of Parliament for Dungun, Terengganu who had resign from HAMIM together with his dissident supporters after losing the HAMIM presidential seat contest in 1990.

Initially the party with the headquarter in Kuala Lumpur had been tried to be registered with the acronym IMAM but was disapproved by Registrar of Societies (ROS) and finally the IKATAN acronym was used.

The constitution of IKATAN was amended to change the name of the party to the National Justice Party (KeADILan) and relaunched on 4 April 1999 during the Reformasi movement. It was subsequently renamed again as People's Justice Party (PKR) after the merger with Malaysian People's Party (PRM) on 3 August 2003.

See also
Parti Hizbul Muslimin Malaysia (HAMIM)
National Justice Party (KeADILan) or People's Justice Party (PKR)
List of political parties in Malaysia
Politics of Malaysia

References

Political parties established in 1991
1991 establishments in Malaysia
1999 disestablishments in Malaysia
Political parties disestablished in 1999
Islamic political parties in Malaysia
Islamic organisations based in Malaysia
Defunct political parties in Malaysia